Thomas or Tom Thacker may refer to:

Tom Thacker (basketball) (born 1939), American basketball player
Tom Thacker (musician) (born 1974), Canadian singer and lead guitarist
Thomas Thacker (died 1548), steward of Thomas Cromwell, Repton Priory

See also
 Thacker (disambiguation)